Filippo Pellacani (born 26 February 1998) is an Italian professional footballer who plays as a centre back for  club Pescara.

Club career
Pellacani was formed on Hellas Verona youth system. On 14 July 2017, he was loaned to Imolese.

On 2 May 2018, he joined Serie D club Villafranca. He scored six goals in 32 matches for the club.

In the 2019–20 season, he signed with Serie C club Virtus Verona. He made his professional debut on 25 August 2019 against Calcio Padova.

On 23 July 2022, Pellacani signed with serie Serie C club Pescara.

References

External links
 
 

1998 births
Living people
Footballers from Verona
Italian footballers
Association football defenders
Serie C players
Serie D players
Hellas Verona F.C. players
Imolese Calcio 1919 players
A.S.D. Villafranca players
Virtus Verona players
Delfino Pescara 1936 players